Stefano Ianni and Luca Vanni were the defending champions but decided not to participate.
Martin Fischer and Philipp Oswald won the title, defeating Marco Cecchinato and Alessio di Mauro 6–3, 6–2 in the final.

Seeds

Draw

Draw

References
 Main Draw

Blu-express.com Tennis Cup - Doubles
2012 - Doubles